Hurra may refer to: 

"Hurra" (song), a song by the punk band Die Ärzte
Alhurra (or al-Hurra), an American Arabic-language TV channel 
Al-hurra, an Arabic title for women with a position of power or high status
Libya Alhurra TV, an internet TV channel 
Al-Hurra, Syria, a village

See also

Ahrar (disambiguation)
Hur (disambiguation)
Hura (disambiguation)
Hurrah (disambiguation)
Hurriya (disambiguation)